Cobalt green is an ambiguous term for either of two families of green inorganic pigments.  Both are obtained by doping cobalt(II) oxide into colorless host oxides.

Spinel-based cobalt green
Doping Co(II) into Mg(II) and Zn(II) sites of Mg2TiO4 and Zn2TiO4, respectively gives one family of cobalt greens.  These materials adopt the spinel structure.

Rinman's green
Rinman's green, also referred to as Rinmann's green, is obtained by doping cobalt(II) oxide into zinc oxide. Sven Rinman, a Swedish chemist, discovered this compound in 1780.  Zinc oxide–derived pigments have been used in many industries and processes.  It is rarely used because it is a weak chromophore and relatively expensive compared to chromium(III) oxide.

The structure and color of compositions Zn1−xCoxO depends on the value of x.  For x ≤ 0.3, the material adopts the Wurzite structure (of ZnO) and is intensely green.  For x ≥ 0.7, the material has the sodium chloride structure (of CoO) and is pink.  Intermediate values of x give a mixture of the two phases.

Cobalt green has been tested for use in "spintronic" devices. Cobalt green is attractive in this application because it is magnetic at room temperature.

See also 
 Cobalt blue
 List of inorganic pigments

References

External links 
 Pigments through the Ages

Inorganic pigments
Cobalt compounds
Zinc compounds
Transition metal oxides